To constitute India's 14th Lok Sabha, general elections were held in April–May 2004. The results were announced on 13 May 2004. The main contenders were two alliance groups of the Incumbent National Democratic Alliance and the Opposition Congress+ led by Bharatiya Janata Party and Indian National Congress respectively.

This article describes the performance of various political parties. For the performance of individual candidates, please see, List of members of the 14th Lok Sabha.

Results of the 2004 Indian general election by parliamentary constituency.

Results by constituency

See also
Results of the 2009 Indian general election by parliamentary constituency
Results of the 2004 Indian general election by party

References

 
Results of general elections in India
2004 Indian general election